Being involved in the illegal drug trade in certain countries, which may include illegally importing, exporting, selling or possession of significant amounts of drugs constitute capital offences and may result in capital punishment for drug trafficking.

A March 2018 report by Harm Reduction International (HRI) says: "There are at least 33 countries and territories that prescribe the death penalty for drug offences in law. ... Between January 2015 and December 2017, at least 1,320 people are known to have been executed for drug-related offences – 718 in 2015; 325 in 2016; and 280 in 2017. These estimates do not include China, as HRI claims that "reliable figures continue to be unavailable for the country."

According to a 2011 article by the Lawyers Collective, an NGO in India, "32 countries impose capital punishment for offences involving narcotic drugs and psychotropic substances."  A 2015 article by The Economist says that the laws of 32 countries provide for capital punishment for drug smuggling.



Overview
Sentences for drug-related crimes, especially for trafficking, are the strictest in Asian countries. In January 2014, then-President Thein Sein of Myanmar commuted all the country's death sentences to life imprisonment. In South Korea, the law continues to provide for the death penalty for drug offences, although it currently has a moratorium on capital punishment: there have been no executions since 1997, but there are still people on death row, and new death sentences continue to be handed down. While capital punishment has been abolished in the Philippines, the Philippine Drug War has led to thousands of extrajudicial executions against drug traffickers, which are endorsed by president Rodrigo Duterte and his government.

Developed nations that carry out capital punishments regularly include Japan, Singapore, the United States and Taiwan.

Use by country

Gallery

See also

 Capital punishment
 Capital punishment for cannabis trafficking
 Use of capital punishment by country
 Mexican drug war
 Philippine drug war

References

External links
Methods of execution:
 Methods of Execution. Death Penalty Worldwide project.
 Methods of Execution by Country - NutzWorld.com

Resources for references:
 Death Penalty | StoptheDrugWar.org. Ongoing compilation of articles about countries sentencing people to death for drug offenses.

 

Capital punishment
Illegal drug trade
Smuggling